Do-it-yourself (DIY) investing, self-directed investing or self-managed investing is an investment approach where the investor chooses to build and manage his or her own investment portfolio instead of hiring an agent, such as a stockbroker, investment adviser, private banker, or financial planner.

Overview 

The DIY approach has pervaded many activities that were traditionally performed exclusively by institutions or trained professionals. A common approach to investing, for many investors, is to hire investment representation to build and manage their portfolios. The main duties of investment representatives are to provide ongoing advice, allocate money to asset classes and investment products, and to make portfolio management decisions.

Individual investors will often choose to manage their own investments rather than hiring outside representation. Common reasons for doing so include the avoidance of agency fees, dissatisfaction with the quality of service or the investment returns, distrust of the financial industry in general, or a desire to take control of the investing process.

In addition, the advent of discount brokerages, proliferation of free financial resources on the Internet, and the availability of online research tools have also contributed to a large increase in DIY investing in recent years. There has also been empirical evidence that spam e-mail aims to manipulate stock pricing by influencing would-be investors.

DIY Investor Types 

A common misconception regarding DIY investing is that it mainly involves the ongoing research, selection and management of individual securities such as stocks or bonds. However, a managed fund, a group of securities packaged together as one investment product or “fund” and managed by a portfolio manager is available to simplify the investing process. Mutual funds, exchange-traded funds (ETFs), fund of funds (FoFs) and target date funds (TDFs) are examples of managed funds. Therefore, given the generous investment product landscape, DIY investors have various portfolio management options ranging from simple to complex.

DIY Investor Types  

 Fund investor: an investor who builds and manages a portfolio consisting of one or more managed fund. This approach puts the onus on a portfolio manager to manage the individual securities within a fund.  
  
 Individual securities investor: an investor who builds and manages a portfolio consisting of individual securities. The portfolio management activities relating to this approach are very similar to that of a registered portfolio manager. 
  
 Trader: a trader isn't an investor per se since they don’t look to hold securities for an extended period of time. However, under the DIY moniker this investor seeks to generate returns by continuously buying and selling securities. They may use an array of investment strategies and securities to build and manage their portfolios. 
  
 Hybrid: an investor who uses a combination of the above investing approaches.

Process 

The DIY investing process is similar to many other DIY processes and it mirrors steps found in the financial planning process used by the Certified Financial Planning Board. Whether a DIY investor or a certified professional, investing in the stock market involves risk and unpredictable fluctuations. It has been said, "a blindfolded monkey throwing darts at a newspaper’s financial pages could select a portfolio that would do just as well as one carefully selected by experts." 

 Develop financial and investment literacy.
 Outline objectives, desires, needs and priorities.
 Gather, analyze and consider relevant information.
 Develop strategies, plans and ideas.
 Construct an investment management plan.
 Implement plan.
 Monitor the plan and make changes accordingly.

Considerations 

Without the use of investment representatives, DIY investors must concern themselves with various investment management activities and factors that relate to building and managing their portfolios.

Building

 Financial Information Ecosystem
 Discount Brokerage Selection
 Investor Documentation

Managing

 Portfolio Documentation
 Asset Allocation 
 Investment Strategy
 Investment Products
 Fees and Investment Expenses
 Investment Accounts

Taxes

A stock trade is considered a capital gain or loss and is subjected to a tax rate based on whether the stock was held for less or more than one year. Typically, the tax rate is lower for holding a stock for a year or longer. If held for a short-term, the tax rate is treated the same as ordinary income and is typically higher, with some exceptions such as property acquired by gift, property acquired from a decedent, patent property, or commodity futures. Tax rates are subject to change each year and with new administrations.

Advantages

Fees

The main negative effect of advisory and management fees is that they are generally applied regardless of the performance of an investment portfolio. This can substantially reduce an individual's wealth over time and is one of the primary reasons that many DIY Investors prefer do take control of their own investment funds. "Typical characteristics of the Do It Yourself (DIY) investor include contrarian points of view and modest budgets that can't afford professional advisors."

The use of investment advisory services attracts fees that are paid indirectly or directly to the various stakeholders who facilitate the investment management process. This may include investment representatives, portfolio managers, brokerages, operating expenses, trading costs and miscellaneous items.

A DIY investor has the potential to reduce fees by eliminating the various middlemen located throughout the advised-client model by accessing investment products and securities through a discount brokerage.

Returns

As a result of reducing fees, DIY investors have the potential to increase their returns by retaining the expenses they would have otherwise paid to investment representatives, middlemen and financial intermediaries.

Qualitative

DIY investors may experience qualitative advantages when compared to advised-clients such as empowerment, independence and confidence.

Disadvantages 

Depending on the DIY investor type, time demands will vary. Either way, some DIY investors will value the time they spend managing their own investments, but others will not. As a result, some DIY investors will consider the demands on their own time to be a disadvantage in the DIY-investing experience.

The stock market does not have to follow fundamental or technical indicators. The individual decision-making process can be psychological and cause overreaction. Overreaction is when information is processed by the investor/market and acted upon in an unreasonable, illogical response. This causes unpredictability and will foil most conventional stock market predictions. A DIY investor may not have the time or ability to appropriately respond to market overreactions thus suffering significant loss.

See also 

 FIRE movement
 Self-Directed IRA

References

Investment